Jae Jin (born in Seoul, South Korea) is an American musician, singer-songwriter, SAG-AFTRA actor and public speaker from Baltimore known for his soulful singing, award-winning songwriting, and sought-after public speaking/storytelling. He independently distributes his original music through AWAL (under Kobalt Music Group) and is a part of the Sinasoid Artist Guild.

To date, Jin has self-released three albums: Kairos (2015), Baltimore Boulevard (2017), and Letters and Drinks (2018). Jin won a John Lennon Songwriting Award in 2019 and also received 1st Place in the International Songwriting Competition. He was also a Finalist in the 2019 NewSong Music Competition. Jin has appeared on Season 16 of U.S. TV series The Voice and on Season 2 of U.S. TV series House of Cards as a principal actor. He received a prestigious WeWork Creator Award through WeWork in 2018 for his original music and powerful life story, and gave his first TEDx talk in 2020.

Biography 
Jin was born in Seoul, South Korea on November 6 and immigrated to the United States with his mother when he was two years old. He attended Chantilly High School. Having spent 20 years in Baltimore, Maryland, he considers Baltimore his hometown. He has a Korean mother, Mihye, and a Caucasian stepfather, John Whiteside, who he considers his real father.

At the age of 17, Jin was diagnosed with a terminal blood-bone marrow disorder. He underwent experimental chemotherapy at Johns Hopkins Hospital. Five years later, while he was a pre-med student at Johns Hopkins University, the illness returned, and Jin repeated the same chemotherapy, becoming the second patient in history to receive the treatment twice.

He graduated from Johns Hopkins University, went on to partially complete an MPH degree from Johns Hopkins Bloomberg School of Public Health and spent many years working in healthcare management at the Johns Hopkins Medical Institute, social enterprise and workforce development in East Baltimore (Baltimore), as well as time spent in the startup world. As Jin was preparing to commence a dual graduate degree in Medicine and Business (MD/MBA program), he chose instead to pursue a career in music at the end of 2014.

Career

2013–2014: Early career 
Jin made his first notable appearance in 2013, when his cover of Sam Cooke's song "Nothing Can Change This Love" was shared by video blog WorldStarHipHop going viral. After garnering over one million views, the video was removed from the service at the request of Sam Cooke's music publishers. Following the popularization of this video, Jin began meeting with record labels, music business executives, and major network reality television shows even garnering the attention of Russell Simmons. However, instead of partnering with a third-party, the musician decided to pursue his music career independently.

A few months later, Jin appeared as a principal actor singing in a scene on U.S. TV series House of Cards.

In 2014, Jin appeared on Christian radio network Moody Radio for an interview on the Chris Fabry Live program discussing his plans to take a leap of faith with limited musical experience.

2015–2016: Kairos  
Jin began his journey by packing up his entire life into two suitcases moving to New York City. Jin spent three months recording his debut album, titled Kairos, with the help of his long time friend and the album's producer, Tim Ouyang of Tim Be Told. On October 6, 2015, Jin released his ten track debut studio album, Kairos.

Jin appeared on ABC News numerous times for interviews and guest performances of "Wild Creatures" and "Ain't About Love".

On August 28, 2020, Jin released a 31-track Kairos Super Deluxe album consisting of the original 10 songs as well as 21 bonus tracks that included live acoustic versions, a handful of special alternative versions, and instrumentals. The super deluxe also includes an in-depth commentary with album producer, Tim, as well as a special final track which includes Korean translation lyrics of "Amen" spoken by Jin's own birth mother.

2017: Baltimore Boulevard 

On November 3, 2017, Jin released his sophomore effort Baltimore Boulevard, an album collection of songs written over a two-year span. In the same month, he was awarded a WeWork Creator Award given to those who "bring new ideas into the world". Jin was also invited to share his life story on stage at Madison Square Garden during the WeWork Global Summit.

2018–2019: Letters & Drinks 

On June 29, 2018, Jin released his third full-length album, Letters & Drinks. Atwood Magazine's Mitch Mosk wrote: "echoing the likes of Fun and Jason Mraz, and with a voice like Sam Smith, Jin appeals to the deepest part of our souls – that tender, vulnerable side we too often build walls around. His songs truly come from the heart, whether he's dealing with tragedy as on 'Six Feet Above', honoring family (his stepfather) as on 'Father's Land', or trying to leave the world a better place – as in album opener 'Dance with Me'."

His hit single, "11:11" has won him numerous songwriting awards, including the John Lennon Songwriting Award in 2019. He was also chosen as one of the eight finalists out of over 800 contestants for the prestigious NewSong Music Competition in Asheville, NC in November, 2019.

2020: singles and Christmas EP album 
Jin released multiple original standalone singles including "So Wrong," "Love U Like That," "The Cost (of Loving You)," "Castaway," and "Pages." The COVID-19 pandemic in the United States postponed touring plans but Jin released a deluxe version of Baltimore Boulevard, as well as a 31-track Super Deluxe version of Kairos, in 2020. In December 2020, Jin released a Christmas EP album titled Evergreen.

In 2021, Jin released numerous singles, including "Let's Be Fools," "Good Kind of Blue," and "Colder."

2022: The Seasons In Between 
On December 16, 2022, Jin released his fourth full-length album, The Seasons In Between which includes a handful of his popular original singles including "So Wrong," "Love U Like That," "Castaway," "Pages," and "Lighthouse" which received Grammy Award for Best Male Pop Vocal Performance consideration in 2022.

Touring 
Jin played his first casual concerts as a solo artist in 2014 at various venues around the National Capital Region including Jammin' Java and Ebenezers Coffeehouse. Since the start of 2015 when he decided to do music full-time, he has toured extensively bringing him to over 124 cities. Notable venues Jin has played concerts at include The Bitter End, SideWalk Cafe, Pianos (club), Rockwood Music Hall, Eddie's Attic, Hotel Café, Postcrypt Coffeehouse, Smith's Olde Bar (ATL), Neck of the Woods (SF), and more. 

Jin has toured North America, Europe (France and England), and Asia (South Korea and Singapore). The majority of his global touring that included London, Paris, South Korea, and Singapore took place in 2016.

His last major touring took place in 2019, when he embarked on a 10 month, 46 city tour.

As of 2020, Jin has played nearly 600 performances across over 136 cities globally.

Band members
Current members
Jae Jin – lead vocals, guitar, piano, keyboards 

Current Touring members
Ryan Schneidermeyer – drums 
Justin Cho – electric guitar, acoustic guitar 
David James Estioco – piano 

Former Touring members
Tyler Carroll – bass guitar  
Philip Chuah – bass guitar  
Thomas Killian – drums 
Andrew J. Choi – electric guitar, acoustic guitar 

Other musicians
Michael Lu– violin 
Joanna M. Hui – violin 
Khoa Le – acoustic guitar 
Nancy Kim – cello

Influences
Jin has cited artists including Bob Dylan, Stevie Wonder, Sam Cooke, The Beatles, and Prince as major influences and often speaks about his varied influences ranging from country to soul to hiphop. His solo live music as a singer-songwriter ranges in genre from folk to blues to soul to rhythm and blues.

Discography

Albums

As featured artist 
 All Ye Nations (2014, single by Tim Be Told)
 The Battle Hymn (2015, Mighty Sound album by Tim Be Told)
 The Great Divide (2016, Friends and Foes album by Tim Be Told)
 Translated Letters (2017, Ashley Court: Chapter 1 album by nak)
 Grace (2020, Love and Happiness album by Tim Be Told)

Music has appeared on 
Korean dramas and TV shows:

 2 Days & 1 Night (1박2일)
 Begin Again (TV series) (jtbc)
 One Fine Day (South Korean TV series) Seventeen (South Korean band) (동네의 영웅) 
 I Live Alone (TV series) (MBC 나 혼자 산다)
 Childish Bromance 용띠클럽 (KBS)
 Lucky Romance (운빨로맨스)
 Monster (몬스터)
 My Daughter's Men (내 딸의 남자들)
 Local Hero (TV series) (동네의 영웅) 
 Sweet, Savage Family (달콤살벌패밀리)
 Mr. Baek: Homemade Food Master (집밥 백선생)
 Please Take Care of My Refrigerator (냉장고를 부탁해)
 How To Eat and Live Well (식사하셨어요)
 Three Meals A Day (삼시세끼)
 The Return of Superman (TV series)
 We Got Married ( 우리 결혼했어요) - Season 4
 Men Are Men (그놈이 그놈이다)
 Show Me the Money (South Korean TV series) Season 7 - Ep.09 (11/02/2018)

Awards and nominations

References

Year of birth missing (living people)
Living people
Musicians from Baltimore
Singer-songwriters from Maryland